Kenema Airport  is an airport located in Kenema, the third largest of Sierra Leone. The airport is mostly used for domestic aircraft to the city. It is the largest and most important airport in Kenema District as well as one of the busiest airport in the country. The airport is operated by the Sierra Leonean Airports Authority.

See also
Transport in Sierra Leone

References

External links
 OurAirports - Kenema
 Great Circle Mapper - Kenema
 World Airport Codes - Kenema

Airports in Sierra Leone
Kenema